Aristelle Luise Yog-Atouth (born 20 April 1994) is a Gabonese football midfielder, who plays  for the Turkish Women's Football Super League club Dudullu Spor, and the Gabon women's national team.

Club career 
Yog-Atouth went to Ukraine, and played for WFC Mariupol in the 2021–22 season.

In October 2022, she played in Lithuania for MFA Žalgiris-MRU.

In January 2023, she moved to Turkey to play in the 2022–23 Super League season for Dudullu Spor.

International career 
She is a member of the Gabon national team ( La Panthère du Gabon).

References 

1994 births
Living people
Gabonese women's footballers
Women's association football midfielders
Gabon women's international footballers
Gabonese expatriate footballers
Gabonese expatriate sportspeople in Ukraine
Expatriate women's footballers in Ukraine
Gabonese expatriate sportspeople in Lithuania
Expatriate women's footballers in Lithuania
Gabonese expatriate sportspeople in Turkey
Expatriate women's footballers in Turkey
Turkish Women's Football Super League players
Dudullu Spor players